"Blue Horizon" is a song recorded by Canadian country music group Farmer's Daughter. It was released in 1999 as the second single from their third studio album, This Is the Life. It peaked at number 6 on the RPM Country Tracks chart in April 1999.

Chart performance

Year-end charts

References

1998 songs
1999 singles
Farmer's Daughter songs
Universal Music Group singles